Maurice of Saxony is the name of:

Maurice, Elector of Saxony (1521–1553)
Maurice, Duke of Saxe-Lauenburg (1551–1612)
Maurice, Duke of Saxe-Zeitz (1619–1681)
Moritz Wilhelm, Duke of Saxe-Zeitz (1664–1718)
Maurice Wilhelm, Duke of Saxe-Merseburg (1688–1731)
Maurice de Saxe (1696–1750), Marshal General of France
Prince Moritz of Saxe-Altenburg (1829–1907)